Peter Roche (1957 – July 2020) was a New Zealand sculptor. He was born in 1957 and studied at Elam School of Fine Arts, University of Auckland. His primary focus area is on light-based sculptural installations, though he first made his mark in performance art. In 1995 he bought the 1920s former Ambassador Theatre in Point Chevalier, and used the space to build his artwork. Roche died in July 2020 of lung cancer.

Perhaps his best-known works are large-scale pieces like Coral, adorning the Vero Centre building in downtown Auckland, and Saddleblaze, installed at Gibbs Farm.

References

1957 births
2020 deaths
20th-century New Zealand sculptors
20th-century New Zealand male artists
21st-century New Zealand sculptors
21st-century New Zealand male artists
Elam Art School alumni